Cüneyt Mete (born 9 September 1970) is a Turkish actor.

Life and career 
Cüneyt Mete was born on 9 September 1970 in İzmir to a family from Şavşat. He later moved to Ankara, and is father to twins Cem and Ferhan. He is a graduate of Ankara University State Conservatory with a degree in theatre studies. He then actively took part in the Ankara State Theatre plays. Between 2016–2018, he starred in the ATV series Aşk ve Mavi, playing the role of Cemal Göreçki. He played in fantasy child series "Kayıp Prenses" with Çağla Şimşek, Yıldız Çağrı Atiksoy. 

With Fadik Sevin Atasoy, Evrim Doğan, Güzin Alkan, he played  in Dudaktan Kalbe based from classic novel and youth series Kardeşlerim.

Personal life 
In May 2019, Mete married actress Şeyma Korkmaz, who starred in the TV series Beni Affet between 2011–2018.

Filmography

Film and TV series

TV programs

Theatre

Awards and nominations

References

External links 
 
 
 

1970 births
Living people
20th-century Turkish male actors
21st-century Turkish male actors
Ankara University alumni
Azerbaijani emigrants to Turkey
Turkish male film actors
Turkish male television actors
Turkish male stage actors